Yurtbaşı is a belde (town) in the central district (Elazığ District) of Elazığ Province, Turkey. Its population is 7,713 (2021).

References

Populated places in Elazığ Province
Towns in Turkey
Elazığ District